The D10 expressway is a partially built expressway in the central Croatia northeast from Zagreb extending towards the city of Križevci. It is currently executed as a 35 km (14 mi) long expressway that spans from the A4 motorway Sveta Helena interchange via Vrbovec, to the city of Križevci. The D10 expressway represents the western arm of the so-called Podravina Y, as the eastern arm is planned to be the D12 expressway.

In 2008 the expressway was planned to be upgraded to a motorway called the A12 and extended northward to Križevci, Koprivnica and Gola, Koprivnica-Križevci County border crossing to Hungary. The motorway was criticised by media as an election campaign stunt. After suffering three years of construction works delays caused by complete absence of funding, Hrvatske autoceste announced cancellation of the motorway construction in May 2012. The  section between the Gradec interchange and the Križevci interchange opened in September 2016.

History

Planned upgrade to motorway 

The A12 motorway was a planned extension of the expressway northward to Križevci, Koprivnica and Gola border crossing to Hungary in 2008.

The eastern arm of the so-called Podravina Y, was planned to become the A13 motorway. The latter was planned to branch off from the A12 at the Vrbovec 2 interchange, which is largely completed, although it may not be used by motorists driving on the A12 as that exit is blocked.

The next section scheduled to be completed was  section between Gradec interchange (inclusive) and Kloštar Vojakovački, where the motorway would default to the D41 state road. Four motorway exits were planned on that section: Gradec to the D28 state road towards Bjelovar and Vrbovec (eastern approach), Križevci to the D22 state road and Križevci, and Lemeš to a business park near Križevci. The works related to the section were officially announced in 2009, however no substantial works were carried out for more than a year. In May 2010, the construction works were announced once again and scheduled to start by autumn of 2010. At the time, the motorway was expected to be completed before 2013.

Further works were also planned, however no start of construction was ever scheduled. The subsequent A12 sections were planned to bypass Koprivnica to the east of the city and reach Gola border crossing to Hungary. Those sections are not described by publications in such great detail as the previous one, although Sokolovac motorway exit is defined by means of its chainage and slip road. Also a motorway exit north of Koprivnica is mentioned by Hrvatske autoceste and Croatian Motorway Concessionaires Association publications.

The A12 had been formally announced in May 2009, but actual project planning, issuing of permits and construction works were delayed and postponed to an undetermined date, drawing criticism of the project as a pre-election stunt for the local elections of 2009. On 2 May 2012, management of Hrvatske autoceste announced cancellation of construction of the motorway, pending approval of its supervisory board. The company reported that funding was never secured for construction of the route, while declining to comment on possible payment of damages to contractors. By May 2012, Strabag, an A12 contractor, demanded 30 million kuna ( 4 million euro) in damages because of delay of construction, but the request was declined by Hrvatske autoceste citing failure of Strabag to fulfill its contractual obligations. On 20 June 2012, the Government of Croatia cancelled construction of the motorway.

Traffic volume 

Traffic is regularly counted and reported by Hrvatske ceste, operator of the road.

Exit list

{| class="wikitable"
|-
!scope="col"|County
!scope="col"|km
!scope="col"|Exit
!scope="col"|Name
!scope="col"|Destination
!scope="col"|Notes
|-
| rowspan=8 |Zagreb County
| 0.0
| align=center | /
| nowrap | Sveta Helena
| 
|-
| 8.0
| align=center | 1
| Vrbovec 1
| 
| Connection to Vrbovec (via Luka), Križevci and Koprivnica (to the northeast) and to Dugo Selo (to the southwest).
|-
|
| align=center |
| colspan=3 |Luka rest area
|-
|
| align=center | 2
| Prilesje
| 
| Connection to Vrbovec via Savska Cesta.
|-
|
| align=center | 3
| Dubrava
| 
| Connection to Vrbovec (via the Ž3288) and to Dubrava and Čazma via the (D26).
|-
|
| align=center | 4
| Vrbovec 2
| 
| Connection to  Farkaševac and Bjelovar via D544 state road.
|-
| bgcolor=#d3d3d3 | 22.5
| bgcolor=#d3d3d3 align=center | -
| bgcolor=#d3d3d3 | Cugovec
| bgcolor=#d3d3d3 | 
| bgcolor=#d3d3d3 | Level intersection, connection to Vrbovec via the Ž3052 and to Bjelovar via the D28 state road.This intersection was operational since 2007, but closed in 2014 in anticipation of the completion of the Gradec interchange.
|-
| 23.0
| align=center | 5
| Gradec
| 
| Connection to Vrbovec via the Ž3052 and to Sveti Ivan Žabno and Bjelovar via the D28 state road. Opened in 2016.
|-
| rowspan=3|Koprivnica-Križevci
|
| align=center | 6
| Križevci
| 
| Connection to Križevci.Currently the northern terminus of the expressway.
|-
| bgcolor=#ffdead |
| bgcolor=#ffdead align=center | 7
| bgcolor=#ffdead |Lemeš
| bgcolor=#ffdead |-
| bgcolor=#ffdead |Connection to Lemeš business zone north of Križevci.
|-
| bgcolor=#ffdead |52.9
| bgcolor=#ffdead align=center | 8
| bgcolor=#ffdead |Sokolovac
| bgcolor=#ffdead |
| bgcolor=#ffdead |Connection to the D41 state road south of Koprivnica.The northernmost extent of the route designed in detail.

Maps

Sources 

D010
D010
D010